A hazard is an area of a golf course in the sport of golf which provides a difficult obstacle, which may be of two types: (1) water hazards such as lakes and rivers; and (2) man-made hazards such as bunkers. The governing body for the game of golf outside the US and Canada, The R&A, say that A "hazard" is any bunker or water hazard. Special rules apply to play balls that fall in a hazard. For example, a player may not touch the ground with their club before playing a ball, not even for a practice swing. A ball in any hazard may be played as it lies without penalty. If it cannot be played from the hazard, the ball may be hit from another location, generally with a penalty of one stroke. The Rules of Golf govern exactly from where the ball may be played outside a hazard. Bunkers (or sand traps) are shallow pits filled with sand and generally incorporating a raised lip or barrier, from which the ball is more difficult to play than from grass.

Bunker

A bunker is a depression, commonly near the green or fairway, that is usually filled with sand. Playing the ball from a bunker is considered more difficult than from closely mown grass, and to do so proficiently requires a high degree of skill. A specialized club called a "sand wedge" is designed for extracting the ball from a bunker. Specific rules of golf govern play from a bunker. For example, a player may not ground their club in a bunker; that is, the club cannot touch the ground before the swing.

According to the etiquette of the game, the player (or their caddie) is expected to smooth the area of the sand disturbed, normally using a rake, in order that conditions are the similar for all players.

Types of bunkers
There are three types of bunkers used in golf course architecture and all are designed to be impediments to the golfer's progress toward the green. Fairway bunkers are designed primarily to gather up wayward tee shots on par 4 and par 5 holes; they are located to the sides of the fairway or even in the middle of the fairway. Greenside bunkers are designed to collect wayward approach shots on long holes and tee shots on par 3 holes; they are located near and around the green. Waste bunkers are natural sandy areas, usually very large and often found on links courses; they are not considered hazards according to the rules of golf, and so, unlike in fairway or greenside bunkers, golfers are permitted to ground a club lightly in, or remove loose impediments from, the area around the ball.

Water hazard

Water hazards, like bunkers, are natural obstacles designed to add both beauty and difficulty to a golf course. Water hazards are typically either streams or ponds, situated between the teeing ground and the hole.

Types of water hazards
Two types of water hazards exist: "lateral" water hazards (marked with red stakes around the perimeter of the hazard) and water hazards (marked with yellow stakes). Lateral hazards are usually adjacent to the fairway being played (along the side), while water hazards generally cross the fairway being played forcing the player to hit over the water hazard.

References

External links 
United States Golf Association - water hazard rules

Golf terminology